The Citadel Bulldogs basketball program is a college basketball team that represents The Citadel, The Military College of South Carolina in the Southern Conference.  The Bulldogs compete in the National Collegiate Athletic Association (NCAA) Division I.

The Bulldogs have had 31 head coaches, with Pat Dennis serving the longest at 14 seasons.  Dennis also coached the most games, at 391.  J. G. Briggs, the first head coach at The Citadel, coached the fewest games at five.  Darl Buse, the second head coach, recorded the highest winning percentage at .857.  Jim Browning recorded the lowest winning percentage, .053, in 1954–55.

The Citadel has won one conference championship, the 1927 Southern Intercollegiate Athletic Association Tournament.  In 2009, the Bulldogs participated in their only postseason event, the 2009 CollegeInsider.com Tournament, losing in the first round under Ed Conroy

Key

Coaches

Notes

References

Citadel

Citadel Bulldogs basketball coaches